Richard J. Elrod (February 17, 1934 – April 19, 2014) was an American jurist, sheriff, and legislator.

Biography
Born to a Jewish family in Chicago, Illinois, Elrod received his bachelor's and law degrees from Northwestern University.

Elrod's father was Arthur X. Elrod, a Democratic Party operative who would go on to serve as a Cook County Commissioner and Chicago's 25th ward's committeeman.

Elrod was Chicago's Assistant Corporation Counsel from 1958 through 1970, and its Chief City Prosecutor from 1960 through 1970.

Elrod served in the Illinois House of Representatives, in 1969, as a Democrat. While serving in the Illinois General Assembly, Elrod was seriously injured and left paralyzed while helping a Chicago police officer capture a man during the Days of Rage conflict in 1969.

Elrod was elected Sheriff of Cook County, Illinois in 1970, defeating Republican nominee Bernard Carey. He would serve four terms. He was reelected thrice, first in 1974 (defeating Republican Peter Bensinger), then in 1978 (defeating Republican Donald Mulack), then in 1982 (defeating Republican Joseph Kozenczak). In 1986, he lost reelection to Republican James E. O'Grady.

From 1986 until 1988, he worked as the Senior Assistant Attorney General, working under Illinois Attorney General Neil Hartigan.

Elrod was then appointed as a judge on the Circuit Court of Cook County in August 1988, where he continued to serve until his death in 2014. He died of cancer in Chicago, Illinois.

Personal life
In 1955, he married Marilyn Mann; they had two children: Steven Elrod and Audrey Elrod Lakin. After his death, services were held at Temple Am Shalom in Glencoe, Illinois. His sister was Gloria Sheppard Bliss.

In popular culture

Elrod appears as a character in Saul Bellow's 1982 novel The Dean's December, both for the Days of Rage injury he received early in the novel and later in the protagonist Albert Corde's friendship during Elrod's career as Sheriff of Cook County.

Notes

1934 births
2014 deaths
Lawyers from Chicago
Politicians from Chicago
Northwestern University alumni
Northwestern University Pritzker School of Law alumni
Judges of the Circuit Court of Cook County
Sheriffs of Cook County, Illinois
20th-century American Jews
Democratic Party members of the Illinois House of Representatives
Deaths from cancer in Illinois
20th-century American judges
20th-century American lawyers
21st-century American Jews